Quipu (also spelled khipu) are recording devices fashioned from strings historically used by a number of cultures in the region of Andean South America.

A quipu usually consisted of cotton or camelid fiber strings. The Inca people used them for collecting data and keeping records, monitoring tax obligations, collecting census records, calendrical information, and for military organization. The cords stored numeric and other values encoded as knots, often in a base ten positional system. A quipu could have only a few or thousands of cords. The configuration of the quipus has been "compared to string mops." Archaeological evidence has also shown the use of finely carved wood as a supplemental, and perhaps sturdier, base to which the color-coded cords would be attached. A relatively small number have survived.

Objects that can be identified unambiguously as quipus first appear in the archaeological record in the first millennium AD (though debated quipus are much earlier).  They subsequently played a key part in the administration of the Kingdom of Cusco and later the Inca Empire, flourishing across the Andes from c. 1100 to 1532 AD. As the region was subsumed under the Spanish Empire, quipus were mostly replaced by European writing and numeral systems, and some quipu were identified as idolatrous and destroyed, but some Spaniards promoted the adaptation of the quipu recording system to the needs of the colonial administration, and some priests advocated the use of quipus for ecclesiastical purposes. In several modern villages, quipus have continued to be important items for the local community. It is unclear how many intact quipus still exist and where, as many have been stored away in mausoleums.

Knotted strings unrelated to quipu have been used to record information by the ancient Chinese, Tibetans and Japanese.

Quipu is the Spanish spelling and the most common spelling in English. Khipu (pronounced , plural: khipukuna) is the word for "knot" in Cusco Quechua. In most Quechua varieties, the term is kipu.

Etymology 
"Quipu" is a Quechua word meaning "knot" or "to knot". The terms "quipu" and "khipu" are simply spelling variations on the same word. "Quipu" is the traditional Spanish spelling, while "khipu" reflects the recent Quechuan and Aymaran spelling shift.

Purpose 

Most information recorded on the quipus studied to date by researchers consists of numbers in a decimal system, such as "Indian chiefs ascertain[ing] which province had lost more than another and balanc[ing] the losses between them" after the Spanish invasion. In the early years of the Spanish conquest of Peru, Spanish officials often relied on the quipus to settle disputes over local tribute payments or goods production. Quipucamayocs (Quechua khipu kamayuq "khipu specialist", plural: khipu kamayuqkuna) could be summoned to court, where their bookkeeping was recognised as valid documentation of past payments.

Some of the knots, as well as other features, such as color, are thought to represent non-numeric information, which has not been deciphered. It is generally thought that the system did not include phonetic symbols analogous to letters of the alphabet. However Gary Urton has suggested that the quipus used a binary system which could record phonological or logographic data. His student Manny Medrano has gone further to find quipus that decode to match census data.

The lack of a clear link between any indigenous Peruvian languages and the quipus has historically led to the supposition that quipus are not a glottographic writing system and have no phonetic referent. Frank Salomon at the University of Wisconsin has argued that quipus are actually a semasiographic language, a system of representative symbolssuch as music notation or numeralsthat relay information but are not directly related to the speech sounds of a particular language. The Khipu Database Project (KDP), begun by Gary Urton, may have already decoded the first word from a quipu–the name of a village, Puruchuco–which Urton believes was represented by a three-number sequence, similar to a ZIP code. If this conjecture is correct, quipus are the only known example of a complex language recorded in a 3-D system.

Most recently, Sabine Hyland claims to have made the first phonetic decipherment of a quipu, challenging the assumption that quipus do not represent information phonetically. After being contacted by local woman Meche Moreyra Orozco, the head of the Association of Collatinos in Lima, Hyland was granted access to the epistolary quipus of San Juan de Collata. These quipus were exchanged during an 18th-century rebellion against the Spanish government. A combination of color, fiber and ply direction leads to a total of 95 combinations in these quipus, which is within the range of a logosyllabic writing system. Exchanging information about the rebellion through quipus would have prevented the Spanish authorities from understanding the messages if they were intercepted, and the Collata quipus are non-numeric. With the help of local leaders, who described the quipu as "a language of animals", Hyland was able to translate the names of the two ayllus, or family lineages, who received and sent the quipu. The translation relied on phonetic references to the animal fibers and colors of the relevant quipu cords.

Numeral system 

Marcia Ascher and Robert Ascher, after having analyzed several hundred quipus, have shown that most information on quipus is numeric, and these numbers can be read. Each cluster of knots is a digit, and there are three main types of knots: simple overhand knots; "long knots", consisting of an overhand knot with one or more additional turns; and figure-eight knots. In the Aschers’ system, a fourth type of knot—figure-eight knot with an extra twist—is referred to as "EE". A number is represented as a sequence of knot clusters in base 10.
 Powers of ten are shown by position along the string, and this position is aligned between successive strands.
 Digits in positions for 10 and higher powers are represented by clusters of simple knots (e.g., 40 is four simple knots in a row in the "tens" position).
 Digits in the "ones" position are represented by long knots (e.g., 4 is a knot with four turns). Because of the way the knots are tied, the digit 1 cannot be shown this way and is represented in this position by a figure-eight knot.
 Zero is represented by the absence of a knot in the appropriate position.
 Because the ones digit is shown in a distinctive way, it is clear where a number ends. One strand on a quipu can therefore contain several numbers.

For example, if 4s represents four simple knots, 3L represents a long knot with three turns, E represents a figure-eight knot and X represents a space:
 The number 731 would be represented by 7s, 3s, E.
 The number 804 would be represented by 8s, X, 4L.
 The number 107 followed by the number 51 would be represented by 1s, X, 7L, 5s, E.

This reading can be confirmed by a fortunate fact: quipus regularly contain sums in a systematic way. For instance, a cord may contain the sum of the next n cords, and this relationship is repeated throughout the quipu. Sometimes there are sums of sums as well. Such a relationship would be very improbable if the knots were incorrectly read.

Some data items are not numbers but what Ascher and Ascher call number labels. They are still composed of digits, but the resulting number seems to be used as a code, much as we use numbers to identify individuals, places, or things. Lacking the context for individual quipus, it is difficult to guess what any given code might mean. Other aspects of a quipu could have communicated information as well: color-coding, relative placement of cords, spacing, and the structure of cords and sub-cords.

Literary uses 
Some have argued that far more than numeric information is present and that quipus are a writing system. This would be an especially important discovery as there is no surviving record of written Quechua predating the Spanish invasion. Possible reasons for this apparent absence of a written language include destruction by the Spanish of all written records, or the successful concealment by the Inca peoples of those records. Making the matter even more complex, the Inca 'kept separate "khipu" for each province, on which a pendant string recorded the number of people belonging to each category.' This creates yet another step in the process of decryption in addition to the Spanish attempts at eradicating the system. Historians Edward Hyams and George Ordish believe quipus were recording devices, similar to musical notation, in that the notes on the page present basic information, and the performer would then bring those details to life.

In 2003, while checking the geometric signs that appear on drawings of Inca dresses from the First New Chronicle and Good Government, written by Felipe Guaman Poma de Ayala in 1615, William Burns Glynn found a pattern that seems to decipher some words from quipus by matching knots to colors of strings.

The August 12, 2005, edition of the journal Science includes a report titled "Khipu Accounting in Ancient Peru" by anthropologist Gary Urton and mathematician Carrie J. Brezine. Their work may represent the first identification of a quipu element for a non-numeric concept, a sequence of three figure-eight knots at the start of a quipu that seems to be a unique signifier. It could be a toponym for the city of Puruchuco (near Lima), or the name of the quipu keeper who made it, or its subject matter, or even a time designator.

Beynon-Davies considers quipus as a sign system and develops an interpretation of their physical structure in terms of the concept of a data system.

Khipu kamayuqkuna (knot makers/keepers, i.e., the former Inca record keepers) supplied colonial administrators with a variety and quantity of information pertaining to censuses, tribute, ritual and calendrical organization, genealogies, and other such matters from Inca times. Performing a number of statistical tests for quipu sample VA 42527, one study led by Alberto Sáez-Rodríguez discovered that the distribution and patterning of S- and Z-knots can organize the information system from a real star map of the Pleiades cluster.

Laura Minelli, a professor of pre-Columbian studies at the University of Bologna, has discovered something which she believed to be a seventeenth-century Jesuit manuscript that describes literary quipus, titled . This manuscript consists of nine folios with Spanish, Latin, and ciphered Italian texts. Owned by the family of Neapolitan historian Clara Miccinelli, the manuscript also includes a wool quipu fragment. Miccinelli believes that the text was written by two Italian Jesuit missionaries, Joan Antonio Cumis and Giovanni Anello Oliva, around 1610–1638, and Blas Valera, a mestizo Jesuit sometime before 1618. Along with the details of reading literary quipus, the documents also discuss the events and people of the Spanish conquest of Peru. According to Cumis, since so many quipus were burned by the Spanish, very few remained for him to analyze. As related in the manuscript, the word Pacha Kamaq, the Inca deity of earth and time, was used many times in these quipus, where the syllables were represented by symbols formed in the knots. Following the analysis of the use of "Pacha Kamaq", the manuscript offers a list of many words present in quipus. However, both Bruce Mannheim, the director of the Center for Latin American Studies at the University of Michigan, and Colgate University's Gary Urton, question its origin and authenticity. These documents seem to be inspired freely by a 1751 writing of Raimondo di Sangro, Prince of Sansevero.

History

Tawantin Suyu 

Quipucamayocs (Quechua khipu kamayuq, "khipu-authority"), the accountants of Tawantin Suyu, created and deciphered the quipu knots. Quipucamayocs could carry out basic arithmetic operations, such as addition, subtraction, multiplication, and division. They kept track of mita, a form of taxation. The quipucamayocs also tracked the type of labor being performed, maintained a record of economic output, and ran a census that counted everyone from infants to "old blind men over 80". The system was also used to keep track of the calendar. According to Guaman Poma, quipucamayocs could "read" the quipus with their eyes closed.

Quipucamayocs were from a class of people, "males, fifty to sixty", and were not the only members of Inca society to use quipus. Inca historians used quipus when telling the Spanish about Tawantin Suyu history (whether they only recorded important numbers or actually contained the story itself is unknown). Members of the ruling class were usually taught to read quipus in the Inca equivalent of a university, the yachay wasi (literally, "house of teaching"), in the third year of schooling, for the higher classes who would eventually become the bureaucracy.

Spanish invasion 
In 1532, the Spanish Empire's conquest of the Andean region began, with several Spanish conquerors making note of the existence of quipus in their written records about the invasion. The earliest known example comes from Hernando Pizarro, the brother of the Spanish military leader Francisco Pizarro, who recorded an encounter that he and his men had in 1533 as they traveled along the royal road from the highlands to the central coast. It was during this journey that they encountered several quipu keepers, later relating that these keepers "untied some of the knots which they had in the deposits section [of the khipu], and they [re-]tied them in another section [of the khipu]."

The Spanish authorities quickly suppressed the use of quipus.
Christian officials of the Third Council of Lima banned and ordered the burning of all Quipus in 1583 because they were used to record offerings to non-Christian gods and were therefore considered idolatrous objects and an obstacle to religious conversion.

Contemporary social importance 
The quipu system operated as both a method of calculation and social organization, regulating regional governance and land use. While evidence for the latter is still under the critical eye of scholars around the world, the very fact that they are kept to this day without any confirmed level of fluent literacy in the system is testament to its historical 'moral authority.' Today, "khipu" is regarded as a powerful symbol of heritage, only 'unfurled' and handled by 'pairs of [contemporary] dignitaries,' as the system and its 'construction embed' modern 'cultural knowledge.' Ceremonies in which they are 'curated, even though they can no longer be read,' is even further support for the case of societal honor and significance associated with the quipu. Even today, 'the knotted cords must be present and displayed when village officers leave or begin service, and draping the cords over the incoming office holders instantiates the moral and political authority of the past.' These examples are indicative of how the quipu system was not only fundamental mathematically and linguistically for the original Inca, but also for cultural preservation of the original empire's descendants.

Anthropologists and archaeologists carrying out research in Peru have highlighted two known cases where quipus have continued to be used by contemporary communities, albeit as ritual items seen as "communal patrimony" rather than as devices for recording information. The khipu system, being the useful method of social management it was for the Inca, is also a link to the Cuzco census, as it was one of the primary methods of population calculation. This also has allowed historians and anthropologists to understand both the census and the "decimal hierarchy" system the Inca used, and that they were actually 'initiated together,' due to the fact that they were 'conceptually so closely linked.'

Tupicocha, Peru 
In 1994, the American cultural anthropologist Frank Salomon conducted a study in the Peruvian village of Tupicocha, where quipus are still an important part of the social life of the village. As of 1994, this was the only known village where quipus with a structure similar to pre-Columbian quipus were still used for official local government record-keeping and functions, although the villagers did not associate their quipus with Inca artifacts.

San Cristóbal de Rapaz, Peru 
The villagers of San Cristóbal de Rapaz (known as Rapacinos), located in the Province of Oyón, keep a quipu in an old ceremonial building, the Kaha Wayi, that is itself surrounded by a walled architectural complex. Also within the complex is a disused communal storehouse, known as the Pasa Qullqa, which was formerly used to protect and redistribute the local crops, and some Rapacinos believe that the quipu was once a record of this process of collecting and redistributing food. The entire complex was important to the villagers, being "the seat of traditional control over land use, and the centre of communication with the deified mountains who control weather".

In 2004, the archaeologist Renata Peeters (of the UCL Institute of Archaeology in London) and the cultural anthropologist Frank Salomon (of the University of Wisconsin) undertook a project to conserve both the quipus in Rapaz and the building that it was in, due to their increasingly poor condition.

Archaeological investigation 
In 1912 anthropologist Leslie Leland Locke published "The Ancient Quipu, A Peruvian Knot Record," American Anthropologist, New Series I4 (1912) 325–332. This was the first work to show how the Inca (Inka) Empire and its predecessor societies used the quipu (Khipu) for mathematical and accounting records in the decimal system.

The archaeologist Gary Urton noted in his 2003 book Signs of the Inka Khipu that he estimated "from my own studies and from the published works of other scholars that there are about 600 extant quipu in public and private collections around the world."

According to the Khipu Database Project undertaken by Harvard University professor Gary Urton and his colleague Carrie Brezine, 751 quipus have been reported to exist across the globe. Their whereabouts range from Europe to North and South America. Most are housed in museums outside of their native countries, but some reside in their native locations under the care of the descendants of those who made the knot records. A table of the largest collections is shown below.

While patrimonial quipu collections have not been accounted for in this database, their numbers are likely to be unknown. One prominent patrimonial collection held by the Rapazians of Rapaz, Peru, was recently researched by University of Wisconsin–Madison professor, Frank Salomon. The Anthropology/Archaeology department at the University of California at Santa Barbara also holds one quipu.

Preservation 
Quipus are made of fibers, either spun and plied thread such as wool or hair from alpaca, llama, guanaco or vicuña, though are also commonly made of cellulose like cotton. The knotted strings of quipus were often made with an "elaborate system of knotted cords, dyed in various colors, the significance of which was known to the magistrates". Fading of color, natural or dyed, cannot be reversed, and may indicate further damage to the fibers. Colors can darken if damaged by dust or by certain dyes and mordants. Quipus have been found with adornments, such as animal shells, attached to the cords, and these non-textile materials may require additional preservation measures.

Quipus are now preserved using techniques that will minimise their future degradation. Museums, archives and special collections have adopted preservation guidelines from textile practices.

Environmental controls are used to monitor and control temperature, humidity and light exposure of storage areas. As with all textiles, cool, clean, dry and dark environments are most suitable. The heating, ventilating and air conditioning, or HVAC systems, of buildings that house quipu knot records are usually automatically regulated. Relative humidity should be 60% or lower, with low temperatures, as high temperatures can damage the fibres and make them brittle. Damp conditions and high humidity can damage protein-rich material. Textiles suffer damage from ultraviolet (UV) light, which can include fading and weakening of the fibrous material. When quipus are on display, their exposure to ambient conditions is usually minimized and closely monitored.

Damage can occur during storage. The more accessible the items are during storage, the greater the chance of early detection. Storing quipus horizontally on boards covered with a neutral pH paper (paper that is neither acid or alkaline) to prevent potential acid transfer is a preservation technique that extends the life of a collection. The fibers can be abraded by rubbing against each other or, for those attached to sticks or rods, by their own weight if held in an upright position. Extensive handling of quipus can also increase the risk of further damage.

Quipus are also closely monitored for mold, as well as insects and their larvae. As with all textiles, these are major problems. Fumigation may not be recommended for fiber textiles displaying mold or insect infestations, although it is common practice for ridding paper of mold and insects.

Conservators in the field of library science have the skills to handle a variety of situations. Even though some quipus have hundreds of cords, each cord should be assessed and treated individually. Quipu cords can be "mechanically cleaned with brushes, small tools and light vacuuming". Just as the application of fungicides is not recommended to rid quipus of mold, neither is the use of solvents to clean them.

Even when people have tried to preserve quipus, corrective care may still be required. If quipus are to be conserved close to their place of origin, local camelid or wool fibres in natural colors can be obtained and used to mend breaks and splits in the cords. Rosa Choque Gonzales and Rosalia Choque Gonzales, conservators from southern Peru, worked to conserve the Rapaz patrimonial quipus in the Andean village of Rapaz, Peru. These quipus had undergone repair in the past, so this conservator team used new local camelid and wool fibers to spin around the area under repair in a similar fashion to the earlier repairs found on the quipu.

When Gary Urton, professor of Anthropology at Harvard, was asked "Are they [quipus] fragile?", he answered, "some of them are, and you can't touch them – they would break or turn into dust. Many are quite well preserved, and you can actually study them without doing them any harm. Of course, any time you touch an ancient fabric like that, you're doing some damage, but these strings are generally quite durable."

Ruth Shady, a Peruvian archeologist, has discovered a quipu or perhaps proto-quipu believed to be around 5,000 years old in the coastal city of Caral. It was in quite good condition, with "brown cotton strings wound around thin sticks", along with "a series of offerings, including mysterious fiber balls of different sizes wrapped in 'nets' and pristine reed baskets. Piles of raw cotton – uncombed and containing seeds, though turned a dirty brown by the ages – and a ball of cotton thread" were also found preserved. The good condition of these articles can be attributed to the arid condition of Caral.

Fictional portrayals 
 The feature film  Dora and the Lost City of Gold, which premiered in 2019, features a stone quipu which the title character Dora "reads" by touching to provide the protagonists a clue to finding the treasure at the climax of the story.
 Chapter 9 of the book The Wine-Dark Sea by Patrick O’Brian features a message communicated using quipus.
 The characters in the TV series See are blind, and so use strings with knots in them as a way to send messages.
 The book The Rise and Fall of D.O.D.O. by Neal Stephenson and Nicole Galland includes the use of quipus by witches as a means to navigate the complex algorithms of time travel.
 The character Amelie prominently wears a quipu in the video game Death Stranding. The game also features a device heavily inspired by the Quipu, called the Q-Pid.
 An episode in season 4 of the gag anime Teekyu features a quipu being used by Marimo to subdue a belligerent Tomarin.
 In This Is How You Lose the Time War, one of the letters composed by "Blue" is hidden as a "knot code" in a crocheted cloth sample in pre-Columbian Peru.

References

Footnotes

Bibliography 

  Web access

 

Saez-Rodríguez, A. (2012). An Ethnomathematics Exercise for Analyzing a Khipu Sample from Pachacamac (Perú). Revista Latinoamericana de Etnomatemática. 5(1), 62–88.

Urton, Gary. 2017. Inka history in knots. Austin, TX: University of Texas Press.

External links 

The Khipu Field Guide (Khipu Drawings and Investigations from the World's Largest Khipu Database)
Quipu: A Modern Mystery
 Untangling the Mystery of the Inca

Science: Inka Accounting Practices
Open / Popular (Ad Hoc) Khipu Decipherment Project (now on FACEBOOK)
History of Counting-PlainMath.Net
High in the Andes, Keeping an Incan Mystery Alive (New York Times, August 16, 2010)
The Khipu of San Cristobal de Rapaz
“Making Sense of the Pre-Columbian,” Vistas: Visual Culture in Spanish America, 1520–1820.
The College Student Who Decoded the Data Hidden in Inca Knots by Katherine Davis-Young (Atlas Obscura, 2017-12-14)

Discovery of "Puruchuco" toponym 
Experts 'decipher' Inca strings – BBC
  – MSNBC
American Textile History Museum
American Institute for Conservation of Historic and Artistic Works

Archaeological artefact types
Inca mathematics
Knots
Mathematical notation
Numerals
Proto-writing
Recording
Textile arts of the Andes
Undeciphered writing systems

pl:Pismo węzełkowe